Alena Hatvani (née Kosinová; 1974/5 – August 2021) was a Czech professional bodybuilder.

Alena Hatvani was one of the most successful Czech female bodybuilders and was a professional competitor in the IFBB organisation. Her best result came in the 2017 Ben Weider Legacy Cup New Zealand, where she won gold in the women's physique category. Her dream, however, was to compete for Ms. Olympia. She had actually qualified for the 2020 competition, but was not able to participate because of COVID-19.

She died suddenly in August 2021 before the competition in Alicante in Spain. She was married and had two children.

Women's physique career

Competition history
 2017 Ben Weider Legacy Cup New Zealand - 1st
 2017 IFBB Arnold Amateur Australia - 3rd
 2017 IFBB Amateur Olympia Spain - 5th
 2017 IFBB Arnold Amateur Europe - 5th (Physique B) and Masters Physique (DNP)
 2018 IFBB International Cup Grand Prix Russia - 3rd
 2019 Czech Open Cup Pro Qualifier - 1st

Women's bodybuilding career

Competition history
 2019 IFBB Romania Muscle Fest Pro - 4th
 2020 IFBB Europa Pro Championships - 2nd
 2021 IFBB Mr Big Evolution Pro - 5th

References

External links 
 

1970s births
Year of birth uncertain
2021 deaths
Czech female bodybuilders
People from Mariánské Lázně
Place of birth missing
Sportspeople from the Karlovy Vary Region